Journal of General Education is an academic journal devoted to issues regarding general education in the United States. It is published quarterly by the Penn State University Press.

External links 
 
 JGE at Project MUSE

Education journals
English-language journals
Penn State University Press academic journals
Quarterly journals
Publications established in 1946